The Coulombe River is a tributary of lake Aylmer which is crossed by the Saint-François River which constitutes a tributary of the south shore of St. Lawrence River.

The course of the Coulombe River flows on the South Shore of the St. Lawrence River, in Quebec, Canada. It crosses the territory of the municipalities of:
 Saints-Martyrs-Canadiens, located in the MRC Arthabaska Regional County Municipality, in the administrative region of Centre-du-Québec;
 Beaulac-Garthby, located in the Les Appalaches Regional County Municipality (MRC), in the administrative region of Estrie.

Geography 

The main neighboring watersheds of the Coulombe River are:
 north side: Lake Breeches, Sunday Lake;
 east side: Moose River, Longue Pointe watercourse, lake Aylmer, Saint-François River;
 south side: lake Aylmer, bay Ward;
 west side: Rivière au Canard (Haut Saint-François).

From this marsh area, the course of the Coulombe River flows over  divided into the following segments:
  eastward, up to the confluence of the outlet of Lac Rond;
  eastward, to the north shore of Lac Coulombe;
  crossing to the south-east the Coulombe lake, i.e. the main plane of water drained by the Coulombe River;
  eastward, to the confluence of the Coulombe North River which is the main tributary;
  south-east to a country road;
  towards the south-east, to its mouth.

The Coulombe River empties on the west shore of Ward Bay of lake Aylmer.

The resort is particularly developed around Ward Bay.

Toponymy 

The toponym Rivière Coulombe was officially registered on December 5, 1968, at the Commission de toponymie du Québec.

References

See also 

 Saint-François River, a stream
 Coulombe North River, a stream
 Lake Aylmer, a body of water
 Les Appalaches Regional County Municipality (MRC)
 Beaulac-Garthby, a municipality
 Saints-Martyrs-Canadiens, a municipality
 Disraeli, a municipality
 List of rivers of Quebec

Les Appalaches Regional County Municipality
Rivers of Chaudière-Appalaches
Rivers of Centre-du-Québec
Arthabaska Regional County Municipality